Mohammed Jamal may refer to:

 Jamal Mohamed (born 1988), Kenyan footballer for Al-Nasr S.C.S.C.
 Mohammed Jamal (footballer, born 1994), Emirati footballer for Al Jazira
 Mohammed Jamal (footballer, born 1989), Emirati footballer for Hatta
 Mohammed Jamal (footballer, born 1998), Emirati footballer for Emirates
 Mohammed Jamal Jebreen (born 1982), Palestinian footballer

See also
 Mohammad Jamal (born 1976), Jordanian footballer